Salvia chinensis is an annual plant that is native to several provinces in China, growing in forests, and in tufts of grass on hillsides or plains at  elevation. Inflorescences are 6-flowered verticillasters in terminal racemes or panicles, with a  blue-purple or purple corolla.

Notes

chinensis
Flora of China